Petro Yukhymovych Shelest (14 February 190822 January 1996) was a Ukrainian Soviet politician. First Secretary of the Communist Party of the Ukrainian Soviet Socialist Republic, a member of the Politburo of the Communist Party of the Soviet Union and a deputy of the Supreme Soviet of the Ukrainian SSR.

Early career 
Petro Shelest was born in a Ukrainian peasant family in a village near Kharkiv in 1908. He studied engineering in Kharkiv, and held industrial jobs between  193 and 1936. In 1928 he joined the Communist Party of the Soviet Union (CPSU) and in 1935 graduated from Mariupol Metallurgical Institute. He served in the Red Army from 1936 to 1937, but transferred to working for the Communist Party in 1937, as thousands of its members were caught up in the Great Purge. Between 1943 and 1954, Shelest was a chief manager of several large factories in Leningrad and Kyiv. From 1954 to 1963, he was respectively Second Secretary of the Kyiv city party committee, Second Secretary of the regional committee, and First Secretary of the Kyiv regional party committee.

First Secretary of Ukraine 
After Shelest was appointed First Secretary of the Communist Party of Ukraine in 1963, he set out to run Ukraine with a degree of independence from Moscow, and to develop the republic's economy and encourage Ukrainian culture. It was during his tenure that construction began on the four nuclear plants at Chernobyl.
 
He antagonised the Soviet leader, Nikita Khrushchev, who publicly upbraided Shelest during a visit to Hungary over late delivery of Ukrainian equipment, then remarked: "Look how glum he is - just as if a hedgehog had been rammed down his throat."

In November 1964, when Khrushchev was removed from office, Shelest was promoted to full membership of the Presidium (later renamed the Politburo)

Prague Spring 
In 1968, Shelest played a major role in deciding how the Soviet government should respond to the Prague Spring, the sudden loosening of political control in communist Czechoslovakia, which created an atmosphere that spilled over into west Ukraine. He was the only other Politburo member beside Leonid Brezhnev to take part in every meeting between Soviet and Czech communist leaders during that year.

Addressing the Central Committee of the CPSU on 17 July 1968, Shelest accused the Czechoslovak communist party leadership of persecuting communists while making no attempt to control "right-wing opportunists". He claimed:

During negotiations on 30 July 1968, he berated the Czechoslovak delegation, complaining that "Your TV shows, your radio programmes, your newspapers and magazines distributed into our regions closest to your borders make our people ask questions which are full of embarrassment". Shelest went on to insult František Kriegel, a senior Czechoslovak communist and veteran of the Spanish Civil War, calling him a "Galician Jew". The Czechoslovak party leader, Alexander Dubček, walked out, and later lodged a complaint about Shelest's comment and tone.

On 3 August, Shelest secretly met the hard-line Czech communist Vasiľ Biľak, who handed him a letter inviting the Soviet government to send in troops to move to restore the dictatorship. This was used as a pretext for the Warsaw Pact invasion on 20 August.

In 1968, Shelest was awarded the "Hero of Socialist Labor" title.

Later career 
In May 1972, Shelest was suddenly dismissed and called to Moscow, where for a time he was a deputy chairman of the Sovmin (USSR Council of Ministers), a comparatively junior role for a Politburo member. In April 1973, he was removed from the Politburo and in May was reported to have resigned because of health problems.

Western observers originally assumed that he had been sacked because of his hard line views on foreign policy. Reputedly, he vehemently opposed the visit of U.S. President Richard Nixon, who arrived in Moscow on 22 May 1972. But in April 1973, he was publicly attacked by his successor in Ukraine, Volodymyr Shcherbytsky, while an unsigned article in the Ukrainian press denounced a book by Shelest, O Ukraine, Our Soviet Land, published in 1970, as containing 'ideological errors', 'factual errors' and 'editorial blunders' that were likely to encourage Ukrainian nationalism. 
 
Shelest himself blamed his downfall on 'intrigues' by Shcherbytsky and Brezhnev. In his memoirs, he criticized their style of government as "autocratic" and "non-communist".

From 1973 to 1985, Shelest worked as a manager of an aircraft design bureau near Moscow. After the collapse of the Soviet Union, he was able to revisit Ukraine, after an absence of nearly 20 years. He visited Ukraine several times and delivered lectures about his tenure as leader of Ukraine. He died in Moscow in 1996.

Notes

References

External links
 
 
 
 

1908 births
1996 deaths
Pryazovskyi State Technical University alumni
Ukrainian people in the Russian Empire
Communist Party of the Soviet Union members
Heroes of Socialist Labour
Party leaders of the Soviet Union
People from Kharkiv Oblast
Politicians of the Ukrainian Soviet Socialist Republic
Soviet politicians
Politburo of the Central Committee of the Communist Party of the Soviet Union members
20th-century Ukrainian politicians
First Secretaries of the Communist Party of Ukraine (Soviet Union)
Burials at Baikove Cemetery